Ardistomopsis is a genus of beetles in the family Carabidae, containing the following species:

 Ardistomopsis andrewesi Straneo & Ball, 1989 
 Ardistomopsis batesi Straneo & Ball, 1989 
 Ardistomopsis marginicollis (Schaum, 1864) 
 Ardistomopsis myrmex (Andrewes, 1923) 
 Ardistomopsis ovicollis (Bates, 1886) 
 Ardistomopsis papua Darlington, 1962

References

Panagaeinae